Sullurpeta Assembly constituency is a SC (Scheduled Caste) reserved constituency of the Andhra Pradesh Legislative Assembly, India. It is one among 7 constituencies in the Tirupati district.

Sanjeevaiah Kiliveti of Yuvajana Sramika Rythu Congress Party is currently representing the constituency.

Overview
It is part of the Tirupati Lok Sabha constituency along with another six Vidhan Sabha segments, namely, Sarvepalli, Gudur, Venkatagiri in Nellore district and Tirupati, Srikalahasti, Satyavedu in Chittoor district.

Mandals

Members of Legislative Assembly

Election results

Assembly Elections 2004

Assembly Elections 2009

Assembly elections 2014

Assembly Elections 2019

See also
 List of constituencies of Andhra Pradesh Vidhan Sabha

References

Assembly constituencies of Andhra Pradesh